Bad Housewife (불량주부, Bullyang jubu) is a 2005 Korean drama series, produced by Yoo In-shik and Jang Tae-yoo and directed by Yoo In-sik and Jang Tae-yu. The series has Son Chang-min, Shin Ae-ra and Yuko Fueki in leading roles.
The show revolves around the lives of Koo Soo-han (Son Chang-min) and Choi Mi-na (Shin Ae-ra), a married couple with a daughter, Song-yi (Lee Young-yoo) and their neighbors and acquaintances. The show regularly made jokes about the stereotypical themes Korean dramas usually have. At the end of each episode there was also a skit called Useful Tips for Everyday Life. The series first aired on March 21, 2005, on SBS.

Credits

Cast 
Son Chang-min as Koo Soo-han
Shin Ae-ra as Choi Mi-na
Kang Jung-hwa as Nam Eun-mi
Yuko Fueki as Park Yoo-jin
Ji Sang-ryeol as Kim Suk-joon
Cho Yeon-woo as Ji Sun-woo
Lee Young-yoo as Goo Song-yi
Lee Kyung-sil as Lee Kang-ja
Kim Sung-kyum as Goo Bon-hwan
Yeo Woon-kay as No Jin-ye
Kim Ja-ok as Park Ok-ja
Song Seung-yong
Kim Hee-ra
Kang San

Crew 
Producers - Yoo In-shik, Jang Tae-yoo
Assistant producers - Oh Jin-suk, Kwan Hyuk-chan
Screenwriters - Kang Eun-jung, Sul Joon-suk

See also 
 List of South Korean television series

References

External links 
  
 Pictures of the show and the cast by SBS 

Seoul Broadcasting System television dramas
South Korean comedy-drama television series
2005 South Korean television series debuts
2005 South Korean television series endings
Korean-language television shows